Adalu is a Nigerian porridge prepared from corn and beans, popular among the Yoruba and Igbo people.

Preparation 
Corn and beans are boiled separately before being combined. Palm oil, onion, pepper and salt are then added to taste.

Adalu is often served with plantain and smoked fish.

See also 

 Nigerian cuisine
 Sweet corn
 Ewa aganyin, another Nigerian bean dish

References 

Nigerian cuisine